Heterogobius chiloensis is a species of goby found along the Pacific coast of Chile.  This species is the only known member of its genus.

References

Gobiidae
Monotypic fish genera
Fish described in 1848
Endemic fauna of Chile